John Mattocks (March 4, 1777 – August 14, 1847) was an American Whig politician, a brigadier general in the War of 1812, U.S. Representative, and 16th governor of Vermont.

Biography
Mattocks was born in Hartford, Connecticut on  March 4, 1777, and moved with his parents to Tinmouth, Vermont in 1778.  His father, Samuel Mattocks, was a veteran of the American Revolution and served as Vermont State Treasurer from 1784 to 1800.  John Mattocks pursued an academic course, studied law in Middlebury, Vermont and Fairfield, Connecticut, and was admitted to the bar in 1797. He married Esther Newell and they had five children; three sons, George, John, and William; and two daughters named Esther who died in their first years.

Career
Mattocks commenced practice in Danville; moved to Peacham, Vermont. He was a member of the Vermont House of Representatives in 1807, 1815, 1816, 1823, and 1824. During the War of 1812, he served as a brigadier general of militia.

Mattocks was elected to the Seventeenth Congress (March 4, 1821 – March 3, 1823).  He was elected to the Nineteenth Congress (March 4, 1825 – March 3, 1827); and served as chairman of the U.S. House Committee on Expenditures in the Department of War (Nineteenth Congress). He was a judge of the Vermont Supreme Court in 1833 and 1834, and declined to be a candidate for renomination.  Mattocks was a delegate to the State constitutional convention in 1836  He was  elected as a Whig to the Twenty-seventh Congress (March 4, 1841 – March 3, 1843).

In 1843, the major candidates for Governor of Vermont were Mattocks (Whig), Daniel Kellogg (Democrat), and Charles K. Williams (Liberty).  In the general election, they received 24,465 votes (48.7%), 21,982 (43.8%), and 3,766 (7.5%).  Because no candidate had the majority required by the Vermont Constitution, the Vermont General Assembly made the selection, and chose Mattocks.  During his term, his son, George, committed suicide and, grief-stricken, Mattocks declined to run for another term.

Death and legacy
Mattocks died in Peacham, Vermont, August 14, 1847; is interred at Peacham Village Cemetery, Caledonia County, Vermont.  His house, built in 1805 and purchased in 1807, stands in the center of town and is a local landmark. His son John was a minister, and his son, William became a lawyer and served as Caledonia County's state's attorney.

References

Sources

Books

Internet

Magazines

External links

1777 births
1847 deaths
People from Tinmouth, Vermont
People from Caledonia County, Vermont
Governors of Vermont
Members of the Vermont House of Representatives
Vermont Whigs
Vermont lawyers
Justices of the Vermont Supreme Court
American militiamen in the War of 1812
American militia generals
Burials in Vermont
Vermont National Republicans
Democratic-Republican Party members of the United States House of Representatives from Vermont
National Republican Party members of the United States House of Representatives
Whig Party members of the United States House of Representatives
19th-century American politicians
Whig Party state governors of the United States
19th-century American lawyers